Oscar Foronda Pallarés (born 13 September 1970 in Barcelona, Spain) is a Spanish actor who has appeared in over 50 films and television series. In his career he has acted in German, English, Swedish, US, Korean and Spanish productions.

Career 
In the early 1990s Foronda started performing in commercials and amateur theatre. He continued acting in different episodes of well known Spanish TV-series such as El Comisario and Los Serrano among others. His passion for theatre and his talent on stage allowed him to play a "wonderful impassioned" Macduff in Macbeth (2003) at the Barbican Theatre in London, directed by Calixto Bieito. In the years to follow Foronda became a prolific television actor, acting in many Spanish television and film productions.

His international career began in 2010 with an appearance in the British television production Any Human Heart, a mini-series directed by Michael Samuels in which Foronda played the role of Faustino Angel alongside Matthew Macfadyen. In the years to follow he appeared in other international film and TV productions. In 2017 Foronda played a journalist in the German TV series Tatort, Barcelona Krimi (2017). Different and more prominent roles in international projects followed. In 2019 Foronda was seen in the Swedish C-More TV series Gåsmamman with the credited role of the cunning and implacable Columbian drug dealer "El Largo". In 2020 he appeared as a Crusader Knight in the Netflix TV series Warrior Nun (2020).

In the Sky AtlanticTV series Riviera (2017) Foronda played Argentinian businessman, Señor Alvarez, while in Season 4 of the Netflix TV series The Crown (2020) Foronda played the historical character Constantino Davidoff, an Argentinian businessman deemed by some as responsible for starting the Falklands War in 1982. 

In the BBC 1 TV series The Mallorca Files (2021) Foronda played Sebastiá Serra, a Mallorcan sous chef.

Filmography

Television

Film

References

External links 

Oscar Foronda in Spotlight
Official Website Oscar Foronda

1970 births
Living people

People from Barcelona
Male actors from Barcelona
Spanish male film actors
Spanish male television actors
Spanish male stage actors
Male stage actors from Catalonia
Male film actors from Catalonia
Male television actors from Catalonia